The team classification is a prize given in the Tour de France to the best team in the race. It has been awarded since 1930, and the calculation has changed throughout the years. There is no colored jersey for this, but the numbers on the jerseys of the members of the team with the best performance in the general classification at the end of the previous stage are against a yellow background instead of white.

History

In the early years of the Tour de France, cyclists entered as individuals. Although they had sponsors, they were not allowed to work as a team, because tour organiser Henri Desgrange wanted the Tour de France to be a display of individual strength. In those years, cyclists could also participate unsponsored. They were categorized under different names; 1909-1914: Isolés; 1919: Categorie B; 1920-1922: 2° Classe; 1923-1926: Touristes-Routiers; 1937: Individuels.

In 1930, Henri Desgrange gave up the idea that cyclist should race individually, and changed the format to real teams. He was still against sponsors assistance, so the cyclists were grouped in countries. This was the situation in the Tours of 1930–1961 and 1967–1968. Between 1962 and 1966 and after 1969, sponsored teams entered the race.

At the introduction of teams in 1930, a prize for the winning team was introduced, then called the Challenge international. In 1930, the classification was calculated by adding the times of the three best cyclists in the general classification.

In 1961, the calculation was changed. The team classification was changed into a points system, where a team received one point for the best team-time in the stage, and the team with the most points was the winner. This system was also used in 1962, but in 1963 the calculation was reverted to the time calculation. In the 1970s, this system was reintroduced as the team points competition, although in a different way: after every stage, all cyclists received points (1 for the winner, 2 for the second, etc.) and these were added, and the team with the fewest points was the winner of the team points classification.

Between 1952 and 1990, the team classification leaders could be recognized by yellow caps, until helmets became mandatory. Since 2006 the best team has worn black on yellow back numbers. Beginning in 2012 the best team was awarded the right, but not the obligation, to wear yellow helmets.

Status
The team classification is considered less important than the individual general classification, and it is rare that a team starts the Tour with the main goal of winning the team classification. If during the race a team is in a good position to win the team classification, the team may change tactics in order to win.

When Lance Armstrong lost hopes of winning in 2010, he instructed his teammates to keep an eye on their main rivals for the team classification, and his Team RadioShack won the team classification.

A good performance in the team classification may help a team to qualify for the next Tour de France. In 2010, a system was set up to determine which teams qualify as UCI ProTeams, and the team classification in the Tour de France was part of this system.

Calculation
As of 2011, the team classification is calculated by adding the times of the three best riders of each team per stage; time bonuses and penalties are ignored. In a team time trial, the team gets the time of the fifth rider of that team to cross the finish, or the last rider if there are fewer than five left for the team. If a team has fewer than three cyclists remaining, it is removed from this classification.

Winners

Team classification

Team points classification
Between 1973 and 1989, there was an additional team points classification.

See also
 Team classification in the Giro d'Italia
 Team classification in the Vuelta a España

Notes

References

Bibliography
 
 

Tour de France classifications and awards